Ånge station, is a railway station located at Ånge in Västernorrland County, Sweden.

According to the Swedish National Heritage Board, the train station in Ånge was a model for the Storlien Station by Adolf W. Edelsvärd.

The rail yard at Ånge station is a major freight yard for the Central Region with 26 tracks, electrified for the most part.

References

Railway stations in Västernorrland County